Drinklange is a village in the commune of Troisvierges, in northern Luxembourg.  , the village has a population of 118.

Villages in Luxembourg
Troisvierges